De'Mon Glanton (born July 22, 1986) is an American football defensive back who is currently a free agent. He played college football at Mississippi State University. He has been a member of the Henry Horsemen, Iowa Barnstormers, Los Angeles Kiss, Portland Thunder and Orlando Predators.

Early years
Glanton played high school football at Benjamin Elijah Mays High School in Atlanta, Georgia. He compiled over 600 yards receiving yards as a wide receiver and six interceptions on defense. He earned honorable mention all-state honors in 2003. He also helped the Raiders to  an 11–1 overall record and into the second round of the state playoffs as regional champions.

College career
Glanton played for the Mississippi State Bulldogs from 2004 to 2008. He was redshirted in 2004. He appeared in all 48 games for the Bulldogs, starting 28 while recording career totals of 134 tackles and five interceptions.

Professional career

Henry Horsemen
Glanton played for the Henry Horsemen of the Gridiron Developmental Football League in 2011.

Iowa Barnstormers
Glanton was assigned to the Iowa Barnstormers of the Arena Football League (AFL) on October 21, 2011. He compiled 38 tackles in eleven games his rookie year in 2012. He recorded 95 tackles and six interceptions in 17 games in 2013 and was named the Barnstormers' Defensive Player of the Year. Glanton accumulated 86 tackles and four interceptions in 16 games during the 2014 season. The Barnstormers left the AFL and became members of the Indoor Football League on August 27, 2014.

Los Angeles Kiss
Glanton was assigned to the AFL's Los Angeles Kiss on September 29, 2014. He was placed on recallable reassignment by the Kiss on April 7, 2015.

Portland Thunder
Glanton was assigned to Portland Thunder of the AFL on May 11, 2015. He became a free agent after the 2015 season.

Orlando Predators
On January 6, 2016, Glanton was assigned to the Orlando Predators of the AFL. On March 25, 2016, Glanton was placed on recallable reassignment.

References

External links
Just Sports Stats
NFL Draft Scout

Living people
1986 births
American football defensive backs
African-American players of American football
Mississippi State Bulldogs football players
Iowa Barnstormers players
Los Angeles Kiss players
Portland Thunder players
Orlando Predators players
Players of American football from Atlanta